Edward Newton (1832–1897) was a British colonial administrator and ornithologist.

Edward Newton may also refer to:

A. Edward Newton (1863–1940), American author and bibliophile
Edward Newton (cricketer) (1871–1906), English cricketer
Eddie Newton (born 1971), English footballer
Eddie Newton (EastEnders)

See also
Ted Newton, character in Beethoven films
Teddy Newton (born 1964), artist
Edwin Tulley Newton (1840–1930), English palaeontologist